"Self Help" is the fifth episode of the fifth season of the post-apocalyptic horror television series The Walking Dead, which aired on AMC on November 9, 2014. The episode was written by Heather Bellson and Seth Hoffman, and directed by Ernest Dickerson. The episode centers on Abraham Ford, Eugene Porter, Rosita Espinosa, Tara Chambler, Glenn Rhee, and Maggie Greene, who have left the church and their fellow survivors to pursue a mission to Washington, D.C., by bus. Upon their journey, they encounter numerous problems, and Abraham's past and his keen desire to continue on the mission are explored throughout the narrative.

The episode received critical acclaim from commentators, many of whom singled out the emotional performance of Michael Cudlitz and the revelation at the end of the episode. This episode adapts material from Volume 12: Life Among Them from the comic book series of the same name.

Plot
Abraham, Rosita, Tara, Maggie, Glenn, and Eugene are on their way to Washington, D.C. in the church bus. After passing a small group of walkers, a mechanical breakdown causes Abraham to lose control of the speeding bus and crash into wrecks on the road, turning the vehicle over. Alerted by the noise, the walkers move in.

With Abraham lightly concussed, Glenn organizes the group to fight their way out of the wreck, killing the walkers as a terrified Eugene watches. Eugene finally joins in and saves Tara's life as she is about to be bitten. The bus catches fire before the group can recover their supplies. Eugene suggests going back to the church, but an agitated Abraham demands that they must continue to Washington and Glenn backs him up after making sure Abraham is okay.

That night, the group make a fortified camp in a book shop, and Rosita stitches up a wound Abraham suffered in the crash. He later thanks Glenn for sticking with him after the crash and says he feels the apocalypse has reached a point where everyone still alive is very strong. Later, Eugene spies on Rosita and Abraham having sex. After Tara catches him and tells him to mind his own business, Eugene confides in her that he sabotaged the bus by putting crushed glass in the fuel line. He has no explanation, other than he wanted to stay at the church, though he does admit his fear of being abandoned once they reach Washington. A shocked Tara promises to keep his secret but makes him swear to never put the group in danger again.

The next morning, Rosita and Maggie suggest staying at the book shop for one more day to rest and gather more supplies, but Abraham is again persistent about getting to Washington. The group comes upon a fire truck which initially starts but quickly stops again. As Abraham checks on the reason for the fire truck stopping, the group inadvertently release a large group of walkers from the fire station. They are almost overwhelmed but Eugene is able to turn on a high-pressure hose atop the fire truck which tears through the walkers' rotting bodies, leaving Abraham impressed.

Later, the fire truck again breaks down in the middle of nowhere. Glenn notices the wind has picked up, carrying a foul odor with it, and looks over a rise to see a ranch overrun by an enormous herd of walkers. Everyone starts to turn around and head back, but Abraham once again insists they move forward. Rosita begs Abraham to come to his senses, but he grabs Eugene and heads toward the ranch. Glenn tries to stop the two, but Eugene suddenly yells out and confesses he has been lying all along: he is not a scientist and does not know how to save the world. As the group looks on in total shock, Eugene says he is only "smarter" than others and a very good liar, but he is also a coward, and felt that getting to Washington was his best chance at survival. Rosita is deeply hurt, lamenting that people died for him. Abraham beats Eugene, leaving him an unconscious, bloody mess. Abraham walks away, falls to his knees, and starts to cry.

In a series of flashbacks set shortly after the apocalypse began, Abraham kills a group of people in a grocery store. He calls out for Ellen, his wife, and he finds her hiding with their two children Becca and A.J. Abraham tells them they are safe, but the three are clearly terrified of him. The next morning, Abraham wakes up to find Ellen and the children gone, with a note saying: "Don't try to find us". Abraham goes outside and finds them dead, all devoured by walkers. Abraham pulls out a pistol, preparing to kill himself, but he hears a screaming man being chased by three walkers. The man is revealed to be Eugene, and Abraham saves him. As Abraham walks away to kill himself as intended, Eugene tells him he is on a very important mission to Washington, giving Abraham a new reason to live.

Production
According to actor Michael Cudlitz via a Tweet, censors tried to ban this episode from airing. Though there were no specifics on what may have caused such a ban, word of it went viral.

Reception

Upon airing, the episode was watched by 13.53 million American viewers with an 18-49 rating of 7.0, a decrease in viewership from the previous week which had 14.518 million viewers and an 18-49 rating of 7.6.

In the United Kingdom, the episode was viewed by 1.146 million viewers, making it the highest-rated broadcast that week. It also received 0.096 million timeshift viewers. In Australia, it received 0.087 million viewers, making it the highest-rated cable broadcast that day.

The episode was critically acclaimed, with many reviews highly praising the emotional performance by Michael Cudlitz in the episode.

Zack Handlen of The A.V. Club gave the episode an A grade.

Isabelle Khoo of The Huffington Post said regarding the flashbacks "While I was intrigued to find out more about this strong character, I felt a little disappointed by the flashbacks sprinkled throughout the episode. First of all, each of them were less than two minutes long, and second, the transitions were weirdly abrupt and sometimes confusing. Nonetheless, the flashbacks gave us a tease of Abraham’s past."

Matt Fowler of IGN gave the episode an 8.3 out of 10, saying the episode "gave Abraham and Eugene their first real character-building/revealing story since they came into the series last February. Eugene was using Abraham to survive and, despite the big betrayal, Abraham was using Eugene's lie to help facilitate his own subconscious denial. An inner pain that manifested itself physically through his own never-healing bloody hand."

References

External links

"Self Help" at AMC

2014 American television episodes
The Walking Dead (season 5) episodes
Television episodes directed by Ernest Dickerson